Ayesha Farooq (Urdu:عائشہ فاروق; born August 24, 1987) is a Pakistani fighter pilot from Hasilpur, Bahawalpur District, who was the first woman to become a fighter pilot in the Pakistan Air Force (PAF). 

In 2013, she became the first Pakistani female fighter pilot after topping the final exams to qualify. She now flies missions in a Chinese-made Chengdu J-7 fighter jet alongside her 24 male colleagues in Squadron 20. Of the 6 current female fighter pilots in the PAF, Flight Lieutenant Farooq is the only one qualified for combat and to fly sorties along the border. 

Farooq is one of 19 women to have become pilots in the PAF since the 2000s.

Reference 

Living people
1987 births
Pakistan Air Force personnel
Women in 21st-century warfare
Pakistani women aviators
Pakistani female military officers
Pakistani test pilots